Brother Rafael S. Donato, F.S.C., was a Filipino De La Salle Brother and a President of De La Salle University Manila, University of St. La Salle, De La Salle Lipa, La Salle Green Hills and De La Salle Araneta University.

Biography 
Donato finished grade school in 1952, high school in 1956, and a Bachelor of Science in Education, majoring in English literature with a minor in Philosophy in 1961 all at De La Salle College. In 1956, he decided to become a De La Salle Brother.

Donato then earned his Master's degree in English as a Second Language and Linguistics at Columbia University in 1965 as a Fulbright scholar. Another Fulbright grant allowed him to travel to Europe and Vietnam.

In the 1970s, Donato became the first Filipino Director of De La Salle Lipa and the first Filipino President of La Salle Green Hills. In 1974, he received a Certificate of Advanced Studies from Harvard and in 1976, he earned his Doctor of Education degree in Administration, Planning and Social Policy.  Upon his return to the Philippines, he was then assigned to La Salle College Bacolod in Bacolod City, Negros Occidental as its first Filipino president.

Donato was appointed Brother Visitor and concurrent President of La Salle Green Hills in Mandaluyong, Metro Manila from 1983 to 1990. He then served as President of De La Salle University-Manila from 1991 to 1994. In 1994, he became a British Council Fellow for Peace Studies at the University of Bradford in the United Kingdom.  In 1995, he received another fellowship from the Hebrew University of Jerusalem's Truman Institute for Peace.

He was then appointed President of De La Salle Lipa in Lipa City, Batangas on May 15, 1995 and served in that capacity until 2003, at which time he was named President Emeritus for his role in the expansion of the school.

Donato was at the time of his death the Auxiliary Visitor of the Philippine District as well as President of De La Salle Araneta University in Malabon, Metro Manila effective SY 2006-2007.  He was also a faculty member of the Educational Leadership and Management Department of De La Salle University Manila's College of Education.  On October 16, 2006, he celebrated his 50th year as a De La Salle Brother in ceremonies held at La Salle Green Hills.

On November 2, 2006, Donato was reported missing after a few hours of swimming off the shores of Morong, Bataan. His body was found at 8:30 p.m., six hours after he was reported missing and one kilometer away from where he was last seen. His remains were subsequently driven back to Manila.

References 

 Madridano, V. (2006). Br. Rafael S. Donato FSC Distinguished Lasallian. Philippine Lasallian FaMiLi, 8, pp. 16.

External links 
 De La Salle University Manila
 De La Salle Philippines
 De La Salle Alumni Association
 Philippine Lasallian Family Website

See also 
 List of people from De La Salle University-Manila

1938 births
2006 deaths
Clergy from Manila
People from Vigan
De La Salle Brothers in the Philippines
De La Salle University alumni
Linguists from the Philippines
Filipino educators
Filipino writers
Harvard Graduate School of Education alumni
Columbia University alumni
Academics of the University of Bradford
Deaths by drowning
Accidental deaths in the Philippines
Presidents of universities and colleges in the Philippines
20th-century linguists